Yantalo District is one of six districts of the province Moyobamba in Peru.

Yantalo is a "quechua" word meaning "wood carrier". As of today the "Yantalinos" walk every day to the forest to collect dry wood. They cut each piece of almost equal size, bundle them up and carry the wood on their backs, usually tied with a cloth around their forehead. Main use is for fire / cooking.

References